Langåra is one of the islands comprising Tiholmane, part of Thousand Islands, an island group south of Edgeøya. It is named after an island in Oslofjorden, Norway.

References

 Norwegian Polar Institute Place Names of Svalbard Database

Islands of Svalbard